James Ivory Manning Jr. is an American politician currently serving in the Oregon State Senate. He represents the 7th district, which covers parts of Lane County, including Junction City and northern Eugene.

After unsuccessfully running for a seat in the Oregon House of Representatives in 2016 (losing to Julie Fahey in the Democratic primary), he was appointed to the Senate in December 2016 in order to fill the seat vacated by Chris Edwards, who resigned. Manning was elected to a full term in 2018 unopposed.

References

External links
 Campaign website
 Legislative website

21st-century American politicians
African-American state legislators in Oregon
Date of birth missing (living people)
Living people
Democratic Party Oregon state senators
Place of birth missing (living people)
Politicians from Eugene, Oregon
United States Army soldiers
Year of birth missing (living people)
21st-century African-American politicians